Botulisaccidae is a family of trematodes belonging to the order Plagiorchiida.

Genera:
 Botulisaccus Caballero y C., Bravo-Hollis & Grocott, 1955

References

Plagiorchiida